Richard Enos "Butch" Thompson (November 28, 1943 – August 14, 2022) was an American jazz pianist and clarinetist best known for his ragtime and stride performances.

Music career
Thompson was born in Marine on St. Croix, Minnesota, began playing piano at the early age of three, and began taking lessons at age six. At Stillwater Area High School, he played clarinet in the band. In 1962 he joined the Hall Brothers New Orleans Jazz Band in Minneapolis and remained with the band for twenty years. From 1974–1986, he was a regular and the original pianist on the radio show A Prairie Home Companion. Since the 1960s, he led the Butch Thompson Trio.

In the 1970s, Thompson's recordings gained popularity in Europe. He toured the continent extensively in the 1970s and 1980s, both as a solo artist and as a band leader or member. He wrote for jazz publications and produced a radio show, Jazz Originals, for KBEM-FM in Minneapolis.

Selected Discography
 Yulestride (Daring Records, 1994)

Death
Thompson died on August 14, 2022, at the age of 78.

References

External links
Official site
 
 

1943 births
2022 deaths
American jazz clarinetists
American jazz pianists
American male pianists
People from Washington County, Minnesota
Ragtime pianists
Stride pianists
20th-century American pianists
Jazz musicians from Minnesota
21st-century American pianists
21st-century clarinetists
20th-century American male musicians
21st-century American male musicians
American male jazz musicians